Dreamcatcher is a 2015 British-American documentary film directed by Kim Longinotto focusing on Brenda Myers-Powell, a former professional who runs The Dreamcatcher Foundation, a charity which helps women in Chicago leave the sex industry. The film won the World Cinema Directing Award in the documentary category at the 2015 Sundance Film Festival. Showtime Networks acquired the rights to the film on 23 January 2015.

Production
The film's producer Lisa Stevens found the story in 2009 while making Crack House USA in Chicago, IL. Stevens nurtured the relationship with Brenda Myers-Powell and Stephanie Daniels-Wilson for several years. Stevens began writing and shaping the story of Dreamcatcher for a feature documentary film in 2010. In 2011, Stevens was introduced to Kim Longinotto, and asked her to direct the film. Teddy Leifer raised the money needed to make the film. The film was shot in ten weeks in Chicago. Principal photography started in September 2013. Wilfred Spears served as associate producer for this film.

Reception
Screendaily critic Mark Adams gave Dreamcatcher a positive review, writing that "as expected from such a talented filmmaker she [Longinotto] constructs a film that veers between amusing and absorbing through to grim." It has a score of 86 on Metacritic and 100% on Rotten Tomatoes.

References

External links
 
 
 The Dreamcatcher Foundation website

2015 documentary films
2015 films
American documentary films
British documentary films
Documentary films about Chicago
Documentary films about prostitution in the United States
Films directed by Kim Longinotto
Women in Illinois
2010s English-language films
2010s American films
2010s British films